The AAC Wamira was a turboprop military trainer aircraft, designed for the Royal Australian Air Force (RAAF) by the Australian Aircraft Consortium (AAC). The project was cancelled shortly before the first prototype was completed.

Design and development
The story of the aircraft and its creators are interwoven, as AAC was set up expressly to design and build the aircraft. The consortium came into being in 1981, with its members being the three main aircraft manufacturers in Australia at that time—the Commonwealth Aircraft Corporation (CAC), the Government Aircraft Factories (GAF), and Hawker de Havilland (HdH). The RAAF, which expressed an intention to buy 69 aircraft, specified a turboprop trainer of broadly conventional tricycle undercarriage low-wing layout, to be powered by a Pratt & Whitney Canada PT6A-25C engine. Unusually however, its two seats were to be in a side-by-side configuration. The RAAF also specified that the type be fully aerobatic, be capable of cross-country navigation and weapons training, have a  cruising speed at sea level, and a minimum service life of 20 years and 8,000 flying hours. AAC signed a design and development contract in June 1982 and began work to produce an aircraft to meet the design criteria under the designation A10.

When it became clear that the aircraft as specified by the RAAF had limited appeal to other potential users, a version with the more usual tandem seating was designed, this being designated the A20; both models were named Wamira. A Memorandum of Understanding was signed with Westland Aircraft to establish a joint venture to market (and hopefully sell) the A20 in Europe. The A20 was subsequently entered in the competition to replace the Royal Air Force (RAF) fleet of BAC Jet Provosts, a competition eventually won by the Short Tucano. An engineering mockup (EMU) was produced in Australia consisting of stub wings and a fuselage from the fin fillet forward. Made from wood & alloy it utilised real aircraft components such as ejection seats, control columns, rudder pedals etc. and was shipped to the UK, appearing on the Westland stand at Farnborough '84. However the Wamira was never a serious contender due to it being at the design stage whilst the other three contenders were flying aircraft.

By the time the RAF competition was lost, the whole Wamira project was in doubt. This was partly due to delays in completing the prototype, but mainly due to huge cost overruns. At the time, the RAAF was replacing its front-line fighter fleet and wanted an Airborne Early Warning platform and inflight refuelling aircraft to enhance the new type's capabilities, and an Auditor-General report found that the Wamira project cost was likely to be more than double that originally estimated. In July 1985 it was announced that the RAAF trainer requirement was now a competition, and that the Short Tucano, Pilatus PC-7 and PC-9 (all of which had tandem seating) would be considered as well as the Wamira. The same month CAC was absorbed by HdH, meaning that HdH now had a two-thirds share in AAC, and quickly became sole owner of the Wamira project when it bought GAF's share. On 16 December 1985 the Pilatus PC-9 was announced as the winner of the competition and the Wamira project was cancelled. The HdH partners were later jointly responsible for licence-production of the PC-9.

Endeavour Aerospace acquired the Wamira design and associated rights from the Australian government in 2000. The aircraft design was subsequently renamed Phoenix, with Endeavour proposing variants with either side-by-side or tandem seating. Endeavour Aerospace believes that the design has potential in the general aviation market as a pilot trainer and recreation/sports/utility aircraft. The original drawings and design records have been kept in safe storage since being acquired.

The A-20 EMU resided at the Westland Helicopters Weston factory until 'Heseltine-gate' in 1986 closed the site. The EMU returned to Australia in 2012 via a group of enthusiasts who raised the funds for transport and fumigation. The A-20 EMU is now in storage at an aircraft restoration facility in the western suburbs of Melbourne awaiting a full overhaul.

Variants 
 A10 - RAAF proposal, side seating
 A20 - RAF and international proposal, tandem seating

Specifications (A.10 Wamira)

See also

References

External links 
 Images of AAC A10 and A20 Wamira - ADF Serials website (accessed 2018-11-02)

Wamira
Abandoned military aircraft projects of Australia
Single-engined tractor aircraft
Low-wing aircraft
Single-engined turboprop aircraft